Cotton Exchange Building may refer to:

in the United Kingdom
Liverpool Cotton Exchange Building, England
Manchester Royal Exchange the United Kingdom's principal cotton exchange from 1729 until 1968

in the United States
Augusta Cotton Exchange Building, Augusta, Georgia
New Orleans Cotton Exchange Building, New Orleans, Louisiana
New York Cotton Exchange, New York, New York
Cotton-Exchange Building (Oklahoma City, Oklahoma), listed on the National Register of Historic Places (NRHP)
Houston Cotton Exchange Building, Houston, Texas
Old Cotton Exchange Building, Nacogdoches, Texas, listed on the NRHP

See also
Cotton Exchange (disambiguation)